Pararge is a genus of butterflies of the family Nymphalidae.

Species
 Pararge aegeria – speckled wood (Linnaeus, 1758)
 Pararge xiphia – Madeiran speckled wood (Fabricius, 1775)
 Pararge xiphioides – Canary speckled wood Staudinger, 1871

References
 "Pararge Hübner, [1819]" at Markku Savela's Lepidoptera and Some Other Life Forms

External links
Satyrinae of the Western Palearctic

Elymniini
Butterfly genera
Taxa named by Jacob Hübner